Office for the Cooperation of the People with the President was a political organization in Iran that was closely associated to then-President Abolhassan Banisadr. 

Since Banisadr was skeptical of partisan activities in Iran, he did not like the idea of creating a party. However, despite using the name "office", the organization "was created out of necessity to fulfill some, if not all, of the functions of a political party". It had branches all over the country.

Parliamentary election and presence 
OCPP issued an electoral list for the 1980 Iranian legislative election, that had candidates shared with the Freedom Movement, the National Front and the People's Mujahedin. The exclusive candidates of OCPP included Fathollah Banisadr (his brother), Mohammad Moballeghi-Eslami (Banisadr's choice for Channel 2) and Mohammad Ja'fari (editor-in-chief of Enghelabe Eslami). Ahmad Salamatian and Ahmad Ghazanfarpour were notable members elected to the parliament under banner of the organization.

According to Houchang Chehabi, the group formed a minority in the parliament. Siavush Randjbar-Daemi estimates that they were less than a dozen deputies, however initially some forty independents were also "ostensibly sympathetic to Banisadr".

References

1979 establishments in Iran
1981 disestablishments in Iran
Defunct liberal political parties
Defunct nationalist parties
Defunct political parties of the Islamic Republic of Iran
Defunct socialist parties in Iran
Electoral lists for Iranian legislative election, 1980
Iranian nationalism
Islamic political parties in Iran
Islamic socialist political parties
Liberal and progressive movements within Islam
Liberal parties in Iran
Nationalist parties in Iran
Political parties disestablished in 1981
Political parties established in 1979